72 Things Younger Than John McCain is a book by American blogger Joe Quint. The book lists items from popular culture that were invented after John McCain's birth in 1936, including nachos, Social Security, chocolate chip cookies, duct tape and ZIP codes. 72 Things Younger Than John McCain also includes people who are younger than McCain, even though the reader might believe them to be older. Quint used the book to show how the age of a candidate was more relevant to their success as President of the United States than gender or race.

References 

Books about John McCain
Simon & Schuster books
2008 non-fiction books